Saleh Mohammad Registani (born 1963) is a Persian author and Afghan politician from Panjshir. He is an ethnic Tajik. During the Soviet invasion of Afghanistan, Registani joined Ahmad Shah Massoud's forces. In the late 1990s he was appointed as the military attaché of the ousted-Rabbani government to Dushanbe, Tajikistan. After the fall of the Taliban, he was appointed as the military attache to Moscow, Russia, where he served till 2004.

During the parliamentary elections of 2005, he was elected representative of the Panjsher province to Afghanistan's House of Representatives or Wolesi Jirga, where he had served till 2021.

He is the author of the Persian language Massoud: Shaheed Raahe Sulh wa Azadi.

References 

Living people
20th-century Persian-language writers
Afghan Tajik people
People from Panjshir Province
Members of the House of the People (Afghanistan)
Afghan expatriates in Tajikistan
Afghan expatriates in Russia
Year of birth uncertain
21st-century Persian-language writers
1963 births